Parliamentary elections were held in North Korea on 10 March 2019 to elect the members of the 14th Supreme People's Assembly. The elections were announced on 6 January 2019. With only one candidate on the ballot in each constituency, outside observers described it as a show election. 687 candidates for the DPRK deputies to the SPA were elected. Kim Jong-un did not stand for election, marking the first time that a North Korean leader did not participate as a candidate.

Background
On 8 January 2019, the Presidium of the Supreme People's Assembly (SPA) issued Decision No. 220, which announced the election of deputies to the 14th Supreme People's Assembly. This was followed three days later by the Presidium of the Supreme People's Assembly issuing Decision No. 221, which organized a central election committee for the election of the 14th Supreme People's Assembly that consists of Yang Hyong-sop as chairman, Kim Phyong-hae as vice chairman, Jong Yong-guk as secretary general, as well as Choe Pu-il, Kim Yong-dae, Kim Yong-ho, Pak Chol-min, Ju Yong-gil, Kim Chang-yop, Jang Chun-sil, Ri Tu-song, Pak Myong-chol and Ryo Jong-son as members.

The Korean Central News Agency (KCNA) reported on 29 January that the constituencies and sub-constituencies for the election of the 14th Supreme People's Assembly had been organized, and, on 3 February, reported that election committees had been organized in the constituencies and sub-constituencies. On 21 February, the Workers' Party of Korea Publishing House produced posters urging voters to "further glorify socialism of our style on the strength of single-minded unity" and to "cement our revolutionary power as firm as a rock." On 24 February, the KCNA reported that sub-constituency committees have displayed lists of eligible voters for the election. On 25 February, the Rodong Sinmun published an editorial calling for elevated political enthusiasm and participation in the elections. The Central Committee of the Democratic Front for the Reunification of the Fatherland issued a similar appeal and sought for the social and economic prosperity of the nation coupled with peaceful relations (and a reunification) with South Korea. On 2 March, the Korean Central Television broadcast similar slogans.

On 4 March, the Rodong Sinmun published a commentary saying that the North Korean election system is "the most superior in the world."

On 7 March, the Central Election Committee reported that the nomination and registration of candidates has been completed. On 8 March, the KCNA reported that profiles of candidates in the election have been displayed at all constituencies, and polling stations have been set up.

Electoral system
The election was based on the principle of a single-seat, first-past-the-post system. The candidate with most votes won the seat, even if they won less than half of total valid votes (majority voting). According to outside observers, the proceedings were a show election. It was also believed that the legislature wielded no influence on state policies and served as a rubber-stamp to decisions taken by the party machinery.

Voting was mandatory, and choice of candidates was not offered. The voters were given a ballot paper with a single name and were expected to drop it in the ballot box. Although voters were able to signify dissent by crossing the name off, or by not voting at all, analysts argued that such actions would be considered as an act of treason and incur the wrath of the secret police.

Conduct
At 11:00, Kim Jong-un went to Sub-constituency No. 40 of Constituency No. 10 Kyogu located at the Kim Chaek University of Technology, and voted for the university's president Hong So-hon as deputy to the Supreme People's Assembly.

At 12:00, the Central Election Committee reported that the voter turnout had reached 56.76 percent; turnout had reached 92.35% by 15:00.

At 18:00, the Central Election Committee reported that all of the voters except for those overseas or working at sea had participated in the election, and that the election results were being counted.

Results
The Central Election Committee reported on 12 March 2019 that the voter turnout for the election was at 99.99%, and that "unanimously" the voters cast their ballots in favor of the registered candidates. The report also included the names of the 687 elected deputies to the 14th Supreme People's Assembly.

Kim Jong-un was not included in the list of elected deputies, which marked the first time that a North Korean leader did not participate as a candidate in the election of the Supreme People's Assembly.

Elected members
The following were elected as members of parliament:

 Mangyongdae: Han Song-guk
 Kwangbok: Yun Yong-chol
 Palgol: Pak Kum-hui
 Janghun: Kim Yun-sil
 Killimgil: Kim Yo-jong
 Chukjon: Kim Song-bong
 Taepyong: Kim Yong-bok
 Wollo: Kim Tong-suk
 Kyongsang: Ri Song-jun
 Kyogu: Hong So-hon
 Ryonhwa: Sim Kyong-ok
 Sochang: Kil Kum-sun
 Pyongchon: Kim Myong-hwan
 Ansan: Kim Sok-nam
 Ponghak: Kim Hyon
 Ryukgyo: Ri Yong-hui
 Saemaul: Jo Kil-nyo
 Potonggang: Pang Sung-son
 Ryugyong: Kim Hye-ran
 Pulgungori: Ri Mi-ok
 Kaeson: Choe Hui-tae
 Pipa: Hwang Sun-hui
 Jonsung: Choe Ryong-hae
 Kinmaul: Ri Sung-ho
 Sosong: Ri Su-yong
 Janggyong: Hong Song-gwang
 Hasin: O Yong-jae
 Jungsin: Pak In-suk
 Taesong: Tae Hyong-chol
 Ryonghung: Yang Hyong-sop
 Anhak: Jong Myong-il
 Ulmil: Jo Kum-ju
 Kwahak: Jang Chol
 Tongmun: Kim Song-hui
 Chongryu: Ri Song-uk
 Munsu: Ri Myong-chol
 Tapje: Choe Song-ran
 Sagok: Kim Yong-bae
 Tongdaewon: Cha Hui-rim
 Ryuldong: Choe Song-won
 Silli: Sim Il-chol
 Samma: Ri Man-gon
 Songyo: Rim Tong-hun
 Tungmae: Ri Kun-il
 Ryulgok: Jo Myong-nam
 Yongje: Han Myong-hui
 Rangrang: Kim Yong-nam
 Jongo: Kim Ki-nam
 Jongbaek: Pak Hyong-ryol
 Chungsong: Ri Un-jong
 Kwanmun: Jo Ju-yong
 Sungri: Ri Pyong-chol
 Wonam: Ko Song-dok
 Ryongsong: Ham Chol-nam
 Rimwon: Kim Kwang-uk
 Ryunggung: An Myong-gon
 Unha: Ri Yong-suk
 Oun: Kang Sun-chol
 Masan: Kim Hae-song
 Sunan: Rim Kwang-ung
 Sokbak: Jon Sung-nam
 Sadong: Jo Hyong-chol
 Turu: Choe Chol-jung
 Hyuam: Ryom Tok-jun
 Rihyon: Pak Hyok
 Ryokpo: Jong Yong-suk
 Nunggum: Yun Kye-su
 Hyongjesan: Ri Yong-chol
 Hadang: Paek Sok-sun
 Sangdang: Kim Jong-suk
 Sinmi: Rim Won-jun
 Samsok: Kim Nung-o
 Todok: Jon Ha-rim
 Kangnam: Ri Man-song
 Yongjin: Ri Won-ok
 Kangdong: Jo Jun-mo
 Ponghwa: Kim Jae-ok
 Samdung: Kim Jong-chol
 Sangri: Kang Pyo-yong
 Hukryong: Kim Pyo-hun
 Songsok: Hwang Kang-chol
 Panghyon: Hong Pyong-chol
 Pyongsong: Chae Myong-hak
 Undok: An Myong-ok
 Ori: Kim Yong-su
 Samhwa: Kim Sung-du
 Kuwol: Min Sang-gi
 Okjon: Choe Chang-gi
 Paeksong: Ri Ryong-nam
 Anju: Ri Chang-gun
 Sinanju: Ri Kye-bong
 Tongmyon: Ri Kun-ho
 Wonpung: Choe Ji-son
 Nampyong: Yun Jong-guk
 Namhung: O Su-yong
 Kaechon: Kim Kum-suk
 Ramchon: Yun Yong-nam
 Sambong: Jang Jong-nam
 Konji: Kim Sun-hwa
 Kangchol: Kim Chang-gon
 Ryungjin: Kim Tok-hun
 Kakam: Jang Kyong-chol
 Alim: Rim Tong-chol
 Ryongun: Ri Il-hwan
 Sunchon: O Yong-gon
 Saedok: Kim Tu-il
 Soksu: Choe Yong-il
 Ryonpo: Sim Tong-chol
 Jeyak: Ryu Tu-hyon
 Subok: Pak Pong-ju
 Jikdong: Song Chang-ho
 Ryongak: Choe Kwang-il
 Tokchon: Choe Jang-il
 Kongwon: Im Chol-ung
 Jenam: Ri Yong-chol
 Chongsong: Mun Myong-hak
 Sangdok: Yu Rim-ho
 Jangsang: Kim Yong-dae
 Taedong: Ko Ki-chol
 Sijong: Ri Myong-hak
 Yongok: Yun Jong-sil
 Jungsan: Kim Song-il
 Kwangje: Sin O-sun
 Pungjong: Han Chol
 Pyongwon: Kim Jun-son
 Wonhwa: So Kyong-sim
 Opa: Ma Won-chun
 Unbong: Pak Tae-song
 Hanchon: Yu Chol-u
 Sukchon: Ri Yong-chol
 Ryongdok: Ri Song-chol
 Yoldusamchon: Kim Jae-nam
 Namyang: Kim Man-song
 Komsan: Choe Yong-song
 Mundok: Kang Hyong-bong
 Rimsok: Rim Tok-hwa
 Ryongo: Kim Song-hui
 Songchon: Jang Sun-kum
 Kunja: Jon Kwang-ho
 Sinsongchon: Ryu Won-song
 Jangrim: Kim Ki-gun
 Sinyang: Choe Yong-hui
 Yangdok: Kang Chu-ryon
 Tongyang: Kim Ok-ryon
 Unsan: O Yong-chol
 Chonsong: Jong Yong-nam
 Kubong: Ju Yong-gil
 Jaedong: Kim Ung-sop
 Haksan: Sin Ung-sik
 Mangil: Ri Myong-hui
 Pukchang: Kim Yong-chol
 Songnam: Mun Sun-hui
 Okchon: Kim Kwang-su
 Inpo: U Won-yong
 Tukjang: Jon Hak-chol
 Maengsan: Jo Won-taek
 Nyongwon: Pak Tong-chol
 Taehung: Wang Chang-uk
 Huichang: Son Sok-gun
 Sinjak: Jang Se-hyon
 Chongnam: Pak Yong-jin
 Komunkum: Kim Hyong-il
 Ungok: Kim Tong-il
 Taebaeksan: Ri Gwon
 Otaesan: Kim Kwang-hyok
 Unpasan: Jang Yong-su
 Cholbongsan: Jong Se-yon
 Myolaksan: Kim Yong-jin
 Jangamsan: Kim Myong-ho
 Pongsusan: Yun Tong-hyon
 Taedoksan: Kim Jong-gwan
 Namchongang: Hwang Kun-il
 Jangjasan: Kim Myong-sik
 Sinpagang: Jin Chol-su
 Taesongsan: So Hong-chan
 Mannyonsan: Yun Pyong-gwon
 Kuwolsan: Kim Song-chol
 Hallasan: No Kwang-chol
 Chonmasan: Kim Hyong-ryong
 Samgaksan: Son Chol-ju
 Sungrisan: Jo Kyong-chol
 Osongsan: Kim Taek-gu
 Roktusan: Park Su-il
 Unbaeksan: Pang Kwan-bok
 Pongsungsan: Ho Yong-chun
 Paekmasan: Ri Tu-song
 Songaksan: Ri Tong-chun
 Suyangsan: Ri Yong-ju
 Sindoksan: An Ji-yong
 Myongdangsan: Kim Sok-hong
 Pongaksan: Choe Tu-yong
 Taemyongsan: Pak Myong-su
 Ryongaksan: Ri Tae-sop
 Songchongang: Ri Pong-chun
 Pyongchongang: Ju Song-nam
 Sujonggang: Kim Kum-chol
 Chailgang: Kim Sang-ryong
 Samchongang: Pak Jong-chon
 Somjingang: Song Sok-won
 Yongchongang: Kim Myong-nam
 Okchongang: Kim Su-gil
 Ryesangang: Kim Kwang-su
 Wigumgang: Ri Mun-guk
 Kalmagang: Song Yong-gon
 Haegumgang: Ko Myong-su
 Pipagang: Ri Jong-nam
 Kumchongang: Ri Yong-gil
 Taedonggang: Kang Sun-nam
 Chongchongang: Hong Jong-tuk
 Amnokgang: Ri Kwang-ho
 Tumangang: Ri Yong-chol
 Kunmasan: Hong Chol-gun
 Naegumgang: Chon Jae-gwon
 Hyoksin: Ju Tong-chol
 Hwaebul: Kim Kwang-hyok
 Sobaeksu: Ri Myong-su
 Kumsu: Kwak Chang-sik
 Haebal: Jo Tae-san
 Moranbong: Kim Yong-ho
 Haebang: Jang Il-su
 Pyoldong: Choe Pu-il
 Jonjin: Kang Pil-hun
 Jasonggang: Ri Yong-hwan
 Ponghwasan: Jon Tae-nam
 Kumgangsan: Ro Kyong-jun
 Sinuiju: So Ran-hui
 Paeksa: Ri Jong-ryol
 Namjung: Jong Yong-guk
 Minpo: Kim Man-su
 Sumun: Sin Ryong-man
 Chinson: O Jong-hui
 Ryusang: Kim Hae-yong
 Wai: Kang Ryong-mo
 Sokha: Pak Hui-min
 Rakjong: Pak Jong-gun
 Yonha: Kim Hwa-song
 Kusong: So Chun-yong
 Paeksok: Kim Jong-chol
 Namchang: Yang Sung-ho
 Chahung: Ho Chol-yong
 Jongju: Kim Kwang-un
 Tokon: Paek Jong-ran
 Koan: Ri Yong-jun
 Namho: Kim Kyong-ae
 Kalsan: Sonu Hui-chol
 Sakju: Kim Kwang-song
 Pungnyon: Kim Myong-ok
 Supung: Kang Won-sik
 Chongsong: Ri Chang-sok
 Pihyon: Hwang Jun-taek
 Ryangchaek: Kim Chol
 Paekma: Kim Yong-son
 Ryongchon: Kim Se-wan
 Pukjung: Hong Kwang-hyok
 Ryongampo: Choe Chan-il
 Sinam: Kim Yong-sun
 Yomju: 
 Tasa: Choe Yong-dok
 Wiha: Paek On
 Cholsan: Jang Chang-ha
 Kasan: Kim Yong-gil
 Tongrim: Kye Myong-chol
 Chonggang: Ri Chung-gil
 Singok: Kim Chol-ho
 Sonchon: Pak In-chol
 Wolchon: Kwon Song-ho
 Samsong: Jo Jong-mun
 Inam: Ho Kwang-chun
 Kwangsan: Kim Il-guk
 Wonha: Cha Sung-su
 Chojang: Pak Tae-sik
 Unchon: Choe Kwang-chol
 Taeo: Kim Song-nam
 Posok: Choe Myong-sil
 Pakchon: Ryu Jong-guk
 Toksam: Ho Kwang-il
 Maengjung: Pak Yong-sun
 Nyongbyon: Kim Kum-sil
 Palwon: Ri Ju-o
 Kujang: Mun Kyong-dok
 Ryongdung: Kim Yong-song
 Ryongmun: Ju Yong-sik
 Sugu: Choe Yong
 Hyangsan: Kim Kyong-hui
 Taepyong: Choe Hyok-chol
 Unsan: Jong Kyong-il
 Pungyang: Ri Chol-jin
 Joyang: Han Chang-ho
 Taechon: O Hye-son
 Unhung: Ho Jong-ok
 Hakbong: Kim Kyong-nam
 Chonma: Kim Yong-gyu
 Joak: Kim Kun-chol
 Uiju: Han Tong-song
 Unchon: Hong Yong-chil
 Tokryong: Mo Sung-gil
 Taegwan: Choe Yong-song
 Taeryong: Jo Yong-su
 Changsong: Choe Hak-chol
 Tongchang: Paek Myong-chol
 Pyokdong: Paek Sun-yong
 Sindo: Ri Yong-chol
 Yaksan: Choe Song-il
 Haechong: So Sung-chol
 Uppa: Kim Tong-son
 Okgye: Kim Yong-chol
 Soae: Kang Ji-yong
 Sokchon: Pak Myong-chol
 Hakhyon: U Chang-sik
 Pyoksong: An Hye-song
 Jukchon: Pak Pong-tok
 Kangryong: Jang Yong-su
 Pupo: Yo Man-hyon
 Kumdong: Choe Sun-chol
 Ongjin: Ri Myong-chol
 Sagot: Paek Kyong-sin
 Samsan: Kim Mok-ryong
 Jonsan: Kim Jang-san
 Taetan: An Kyong-hwa
 Kwasan: Hong Pong-chol
 Jangyon: Mun In-chol
 Rakyon: Ri Yong-chol
 Samchon: Ri Ik-jung
 Talchon: Kim Jong
 Songhwa: Kim Son-hui
 Unryul: Kim Ung-chol
 Kumsanpo: Kang Kil-yong
 Jangryon: Ri Hwa-gyong
 Unchon: Kil Kyong-hui
 Ryangdam: Kim Ik-song
 Anak: Ko In-ho
 Wolji: Kim Chang-yop
 Taechu: Choe Yong-sam
 Omgot: Ri Jae-sik
 Sinchon: Kim Chang-nam
 Saenal: Mun Ung-jo
 Saegil: Pak Yong-ho
 Panjong: Kwon Jong-sil
 Jaeryong: Choe Hwi
 Samjigang: Ri Hye-suk
 Jangguk: Kim Yong-ae
 Pukji: Kim Tae-song
 Sinwon: So Pyong-hwan
 Muhak: Song Won-gil
 Pongchon: Kim Chun-do
 Sindap: Kang Jong-hui
 Paechon: Won Kyong-mo
 Kumsong: Kim Tae-sik
 Jongchon: Kim Jin-guk
 Unpong: Ri Chol-man
 Kumgok: Kang Myong-chol
 Yonan: Pak Tae-dok
 Ohyon: Jin Yon-sil
 Songho: Hong Myong-gi
 Chontae: Choe Tong-yun
 Haewol: Kim Myong-chol
 Chongdan: Yang Yong-gil
 Namchon: Choe Sung-ho
 Tokdal: Ri Hong-sop
 Chongjong: Pak Yon-ok
 Ryongyon: Kim Jong-ho
 Kumi: Ri Jong-suk
 Kwail: O In-nam
 Sindae: Jong Su-hyok
 Sariwon: O Myong-chun
 Wonju: Chae Kang-hwan
 Migok: Song Yun-hui
 Songyong: Kang Yun-sok
 Kwangsong: Ri Son-gwon
 Jongbang: Ri Yong-rae
 Unha: Ri Yong-ho
 Kuchon: Ri Yong-sim
 Kaesong: Paek Chun-gi
 Tonghyon: Jong Kyong-taek
 Sonjok: Choe Pyong-ryol
 Unhak: Pang Kang-su
 Tokam: Ri Kum-chol
 Panmun: Kim Yong-chol
 Ryongsan: Ri Kil-song
 Kaepung: An Yong-hwan
 Hwangju: Ri Hye-jong
 Chongryong: Ro Kwang-sop
 Samjong: Kim Chol-guk
 Hukgyo: Han Chol-nam
 Yontan: Ri Hang-gol
 Misan: Ri Yong-sik
 Pongsan: Ryang Jong-hun
 Madong: Kim Jae-chol
 Chonggye: Kim Chang-gwang
 Kuyon: Jo Chol-song
 Unpa: Ko Kil-son
 Kangan: Kim Tae-song
 Kwangmyong: Cha Jae-hui
 Risan: Ko Jong-chol
 Taechon: Kim Jong-ok
 Sohung: Han I-chol
 Poman: O Myong-song
 Sunan: Kwon Tae-yong
 Namjong: Pak Kum-song
 Yonsan: Kim Tu-chol
 Holdong: Kim Jae-song
 Sinpyong: An Tong-chun
 Mannyon: Ri Yong-jin
 Koksan: Ryu Myong-kum
 Pyongam: Pak Myong-son
 Singye: Nam Yong-suk
 Jongbong: Ju Tong-chol
 Chuchon: Choe Sin-uk
 Pyongsan: Ki Kwang-ho
 Chongsu: Ri Myong-hui
 Namchon: Kim Jong-chol
 Kumchon: Kim Wan-su
 Hyonnae: Pak Hye-suk
 Soktam: Ho Pong-il
 Songrim: Ri Jong-chol
 Tangsan: Ho Ryong
 Tosan: Kim Jong-ok
 Yangsa: Jang Ki-ho
 Jangpung: Jo Yong-chol
 Kuhwa: Kim Kyong-sim
 Sangwon: Jo Yon-jun
 Myongdan: Yun Jae-hyok
 Junghwa: Han Ung-su
 Chaesong: Ri Jong-hyok
 Sungho: Ri Kum-ok
 Mandal: Im Hun
 Kanggye: Ro Tu-chol
 Yonju: An Yong-nam
 Puchang: Jang Hyok
 Yahak: Choe Chang-son
 Sokhyon: Kim Hye-ran
 Wiryong: Jong Kwang-chol
 Naeryong: Han Yong-ho
 Manpo: Kim Myong-hun
 Kuo: Chae Jong-sok
 Munak: Kim Chon-ho
 Huichon: Kim Jae-ryong
 Solmoru: Pak Chol-hun
 Chupyong: Ham Nam-hyok
 Chongnyon: Tae Jong-su
 Jonpyong: Ri Yong-hon
 Songgan: Ri Sung-kum
 Songryong: Sin Kwan-jin
 Jonchon: Ri Su-ryon
 Hakmu: Kim Yong-il
 Unsong: Hong Sung-mu
 Ryongrim: So Kyong-ho
 Tongsin: Pak Chun-gon
 Songwon: Kim Chong-gyun
 Janggang: Pak Yong-bok
 Hyangha: Ko Pyong-hyon
 Rangrim: Ri Hyong-gun
 Hwapyong: So Kyong-chol
 Jasong: Kim Kwang-ju
 Junggang: Kim Tuk-mong
 Sijung: Jang Il-ryong
 Wiwon: Kim Chang-gol
 Ryanggang: Song Jong-hak
 Chosan: Ri Sung-nyo
 Kopung: Ri Chol-ho
 Usi: Jang Kum-hui
 Segil: Rim Sun-hui
 Kwanpung: Pyon Ung-gyu
 Jangdok: Choe Kwang-il
 Pongchun: Jang Sung-ho
 Myongsok: Yu Kyong-ho
 Wonnam: Paek Yong-suk
 Pohwa: An Jong-su
 Pokmak: Ri Yong-sik
 Kalma: Han Sang-jun
 Munchon: Won Nam-chol
 Munpyong: Ri Chol-ho
 Okpyong: Kim Jong-sim
 Chonnae: Om Yong-hak
 Hwara: Pak Kwang-song
 Anbyon: Pak Jong-nam
 Paehwa: U Jong-suk
 Kosan: Han Yong-chol
 Pupyong: Ham Jong-chol
 Solbong: Son Kum-wol
 Tongchon: Jo Song-chol
 Songjon: Pak Chol-min
 Kosong: Jon Chang-guk
 Onjong: Choe Son-hui
 Kumgang: So Kwang-ok
 Soksa: Kye Hun-nyo
 Changdo: Hwang Man-bok
 Kimhwa: Ri Tu-il
 Songsan: Mun Yong-chol
 Huiyang: Kim Guk-chang
 Sepo: Ri Ik
 Hupyong: Hwang Min
 Pyonggang: An Yong-sik
 Pokgye: Nam Sung-u
 Cholwon: Sin Chol-hui
 Naemun: Pak Jong-ho
 Ichon: Ryu Jong-chol
 Pangyo: Paek Jong-sun
 Popdong: Kim Kum-yong
 Somun: Yu Kyong-hak
 Samil: Ri Tae-jin
 Sangsin: Yun Chol-ho
 Tonghungsan: Mun Yong-son
 Sosang: Kim Myong-gil
 Pungho: Mun Sang-gwon
 Huisang: Ho Song-chol
 Segori: Han Song-il
 Jangsong: Yu Kyong-suk
 Toksan: Kim Sung-jin
 Sapo: Kim Sung-gi
 Saegori: Pak Song-il
 Choun: Kang Son
 Hungdok: Ri Guk-chol
 Hungso: Kim Kwang-sik
 Haean: Jang Song-chol
 Unjung: Ri Kyong-il
 Chongi: Ri Chang-ryong
 Ryujong: Kim Chol-ha
 Soho: Kim Chol-yong
 Sinpo: Ri Yu-chol
 Pungo: Kang Chol-gu
 Ohang: Kim Song-il
 Yanghwa: Song Chun-sop
 Tanchon: Kim Sang-song
 Ssangryong: Jon Hye-song
 Sindanchon: Ho Tae-chol
 Omong: Kang Jong-gwan
 Ryongdae: Ri Jong-mu
 Kwangchon: Kim Chol-su
 Paekgumsan: Jang Chun-gun
 Kumgol: Choe Chol
 Pukdu: Hwang Yong-sam
 Sudong: Kim Jong-dok
 Ryongpyong: Kim Jong-sok
 Jangdong: Ryom Chol-su
 Kowon: Kim Kwang-sok
 Puraesan: Kim Hyon-jin
 Yodok: Ri Jong-hwa
 Kumya: Ju Hwa-suk
 Inhung: Yun Yong-il
 Kajin: Choe Jong-ho
 Kwangmyongsong: Kim Pong-yong
 Jungnam: Sok Won-chun
 Jongpyong: Nam Yong-hwal
 Sondok: Pak Chun-nam
 Sinsang: Jon Song-guk
 Chowon: Ri Myong-chol
 Toksan: Ri Sung-nyon
 Jangjin: Pak Chung-u
 Yangji: Pang Chang-dok
 Pujon: Kang Song-hui
 Sinhung: Kim Sok-sun
 Sangwonchon: Jon Il
 Puhung: Han Ju-song
 Yonggwang: Ri Wan-ho
 Suchon: Pak Jong-hyon
 Kisang: Han Ryong-guk
 Hamju: Choe Il-ryong
 Kusang: Kim Song-bong
 Tongbong: Ri Yong-ae
 Sangjung: Kang Su-rin
 Sojung: Kim Tong-chun
 Samho: Pak Hun
 Hongwon: Choe Pok-sun
 Sanyang: Han Chang-sun
 Unpo: Ju Jong-kyong
 Toksong: Kang Jong-ho
 Janghung: Jong Kyong-hwa
 Pukchong: Ko Tae-ryong
 Sinchang: Kim Kyong-ho
 Sinbukchong: Kim Song-gu
 Chonghung: Han Myong-hui
 Riwon: Kang Jong-sil
 Rahung: Kim Yong-gyu
 Chaejong: Kim Kyong-jun
 Hochon: Tong Jong-ho
 Sinhong: Ri Kang-son
 Sangnong: Choe In-ho
 Kumho: Ri Tam
 Ranam: Tae Jin-hyok
 Rabuk: Pyon Sung-gun
 Namchongjin: Kim Song
 Puyun: Ryang Yong-ho
 Songpyong: Kim Kwang-nam
 Sabong: Choe Ju-chol
 Kangdok: Tong Hun
 Susong: Choe Yong-ho
 Sunam: Kim Song-won
 Malum: Hong Kil-ho
 Pohang: Kim Hyon-myong
 Subuk: Kim Chol-ho
 Namhyang: Kim Ki-song
 Sinjin: Ri Chol
 Kyodong: Kim Chang-gil
 Chongam: Ri Yong-son
 Ryonjin: Kang Yong-ju
 Kwanhae: Kang Yong-su
 Huiryong: Ko Ju-gwang
 Osandok: Ri Sun-sil
 Manyang: Ri Kwi-ok
 Yuson: Ri Hye-sun
 Songam: Jon Song-man
 Chonghak: Ho Tae-ryol
 Jegang: Ri Song-jae
 Jangpyong: Choe Il
 Haksong: Choe Un-sil
 Kilju: Rim Chun-hui
 Ilsin: Kim Il
 Junam: Yun Kang-ho
 Yongbok: Choe Kwi-nam
 Hwadae: Jo Kum-hui
 Ryongpo: Kim Hyong-jun
 Myongchon: Ryang Won-jin
 Ryongam: U Ung-ho
 Myonggan: Choe Yong-suk
 Ryongban: Kim Yong-ho
 Kukdong: Ho Jong-man
 Orang: Choe Yong-suk
 Odaejin: Ri Yong-chol
 Kyongsong: Pak Kun-sok
 Hamyon: Jang Chun-sil
 Sungam: Nam Hong-son
 Puryong: Pak In-su
 Musan: Myong Song-chol
 Soedol: Pyo Il-sok
 Sangchang: Kim Chung-gol
 Yonsa: Ro Song-ung
 Onsong: Ri Hi-yong
 Wangjaesan: Kim Ok-ryon
 Jongsong: Kim Kwang-chol
 Kyongwon: Sin Chol-ung
 Kogonwon: Jon Han-gil
 Ryongbok: Ji Jae-ryong
 Kyonghung: O Kyong-sok
 Haksong: Kim Yong-sil
 Obong: Jang Kil-ryong
 Hyesan: Pak Chol-ho
 Hyejang: Jang Hyong-suk
 Tapsong: Choe Ryon-hui
 Songbong: Ri Sang-won
 Ryonbong: Kim Mi-nam
 Sinpa: Kim Sung-hui
 Popyong: Song Kum-nam
 Koup: Ri Yong-il
 Pungsan: Jon Tong-ho
 Pochon: Rim Chun-nam
 Samjiyon: Yang Myong-chol
 Taehongdan: Kim Kwang-ho
 Paekam: An Mun-hak
 Yupyong: Kim Kang-il
 Unhung: Ri Song-guk
 Sangjang: Yun Pok-nam
 Kapsan: Han Su-gyong
 Oil: Kim Sang-uk
 Pungso: Yon Kyong-chol
 Samju: Ju Hang-gon
 Hanggu: Kang Yang-mo
 Hupo: Pak Jun-ho
 Munae: Song Sung-chol
 Konguk: Choe Tong-myong
 Ryusa: Kang Dok-chun
 Waudo: Ri Gil-chun
 Namsan: Kim Tuk-sam
 Taedae: Jang Ryong-sik
 Kapmun: Tokgo Chang-guk
 Kangso: Kim Pyong-hae
 Sohak: Jang Chol-jun
 Chongsan: Yun Chun-hwa
 Sogi: Ri Kwang-chol
 Tokhung: Kim Yong-jae
 Chollima: Kim Han-il
 Kangsan: Pak Kwang-ho
 Pobong: Ri Nam-son
 Hwasok: Kim Kye-gwan
 Taean: Choe Sung-ryong
 Oksu: Ro Ik
 Ryonggang: Im Jong-sil
 Ryongho: Chang Jae-ryong
 Onchon: Rim Kyong-man
 Haeun: Jo Kyong-guk
 Sohwa: Sin In-ok
 Kwisong: Sin Tong-ho
 Rajin: Sin Yong-chol
 Tongmyong: Choe Yong-bok
 Changpyong: Han Jang-su
 Sonbong: Jo Jong-ho
 Ungsang: Sin Tong-su

References

External links
Full report of the Central Electoral Committee at Rodong Sinmun 

Elections in North Korea
North Korea
Parliamentary
Supreme People's Assembly
Single-candidate elections
Election and referendum articles with incomplete results